The PGM-11 Redstone was the first large American ballistic missile. A short-range ballistic missile (SRBM), it was in active service with the United States Army in West Germany from June 1958 to June 1964 as part of NATO's Cold War defense of Western Europe. It was the first US missile to carry a live nuclear warhead, in the 1958 Pacific Ocean weapons test, Hardtack Teak.

The Redstone was a direct descendant of the German V-2 rocket, developed primarily by a team of German rocket engineers brought to the United States after World War II. Redstone's prime contractor was the Chrysler Corporation.

The Redstone spawned the Redstone rocket family which holds a number of firsts in the US space program, notably launching the first US astronaut. It was retired by the Army in 1964 and replaced by the solid-fueled MGM-31 Pershing. Surplus missiles were widely used for test missions and space launches, including the first US man in space, and in 1967 the launch of Australia's first satellite.

History

Redstone was a direct descendant of the German V-2 rocket, developed by a team of predominantly German rocket engineers under the leadership of Wernher von Braun, that had been brought to the United States after World War II as part of Operation Paperclip.

A product of the Army Ballistic Missile Agency (ABMA) at Redstone Arsenal in Huntsville, Alabama, Redstone was designed as a surface-to-surface missile for the U.S. Army. It was named for the arsenal on 8 April 1952, which traced its name to the region's red rocks and soil. The first Redstone lifted off from LC-4A at Cape Canaveral on 20 August 1953. It flew for one minute and 20 seconds before suffering an engine failure and falling into the sea. Following this partial success, the second test was conducted on 27 January 1954, this time without a hitch as the missile flew . After these first two prototypes were flown, an improved engine was introduced to reduce problems with LOX turbopump cavitation.

The third Redstone flight on 5 May was a total loss as the engine cut off one second after launch, causing the rocket to fall back on the pad and explode. After this incident, Major General Holger Toftoy pressured Wernher von Braun for the cause of the failure. The latter replied that he had no idea, but they would review telemetry and other data to find out. Toftoy persisted, asking "Wernher, why did the rocket explode?" An exasperated von Braun said "It exploded because the damn sonofabitch blew up!"

Von Braun pressured the ABMA team to improve reliability and workmanship standards, allegedly remarking that "Missile reliability will require that the target area is more dangerous than the launch area." Subsequent test flights went better and the Army declared Redstone operational in mid-1955. Testing was moved from LC-4 to the bigger LC-5 and LC-6.

The Redstone program proved to be a bone of contention between the Army and Air Force due to their different ideas of nuclear warfare. The Army favored using small warheads on mobile missiles as tactical battlefield weapons while the Air Force, which was responsible for the ICBM program, wanted large cross-continental missiles that could strike Soviet targets and rapidly cripple the USSR's infrastructure and ability to wage war.

With the arrival of newer solid-fueled missiles that could be stored and not require fueling before launch, Redstone was rendered obsolete and production ended in 1961. The 40th Artillery Group was deactivated in February 1964 and 46th Artillery Group was deactivated in June 1964, as Redstone missiles were replaced by the Pershing missile in the U.S. Army arsenal.  All Redstone missiles and equipment deployed to Europe were returned to the United States by the third quarter of 1964. In October 1964, the Redstone missile was ceremonially retired from active service at Redstone Arsenal.

Description
It consisted of a thrust unit for powered flight and a missile body for overall missile control and payload delivery on target. During powered flight, Redstone burned a fuel mixture of 25 percent water–75 percent ethyl alcohol with liquid oxygen (LOX) used as the oxidizer. Later Redstones used Hydyne, 60% unsymmetrical dimethylhydrazine (UDMH) and 40% diethylenetriamine (DETA), as the fuel. The missile body consisted of an aft unit containing the instrument compartment, and the warhead unit containing the payload compartment and the radar altimeter fuze. The missile body was separated from the thrust unit 20–30 seconds after the termination of powered flight, as determined by the preset range to target. The body continued on a controlled ballistic trajectory to the target impact point. The thrust unit continued on its own uncontrolled ballistic trajectory, impacting short of the designated target.

The nuclear-armed Redstone carried the W39, either a MK 39Y1 Mod 1 or MK 39Y2 Mod 1, warhead with a yield of 3.8 megatons.

Production
Chrysler Corporation was awarded the prime production contract, to be made at the newly renamed Michigan Ordnance Missile Plant in Warren, Michigan. The navy-owned facility was previously known as the Naval Industrial Reserve Aircraft Plant used for jet engine production.  Following the cancellation of a planned jet engine program, the facility was made available to the Chrysler Corporation for missile production, and began missile and support equipment production in 1952. Rocketdyne Division of North American Aviation Company provided the rocket engines; Ford Instrument Company, division of Sperry Rand Corporation, produced the guidance and control systems; and Reynolds Metals Company fabricated fuselage assemblies as subcontractors to Chrysler.

Redstone derivatives

In 1955, the Jupiter-C rocket (not to be confused with the later, unrelated Jupiter IRBM) was developed as an enhanced Redstone for atmospheric and reentry vehicle tests. It had elongated propellant tanks for increased burn time and a new engine that burned a fuel mixture known as hydyne and under the name of the Jupiter C/Juno 1 was used for the first successful US space launch of the Explorer 1 satellite in 1958.

It retained the Jupiter C's longer propellant tanks, but went back to using ethyl alcohol/water for propellant instead of hydyne.
From 1966 to 1967, a series of surplus modified Redstones called Spartas were launched from Woomera, South Australia as part of a joint U.S.–United Kingdom–Australian research program aimed at understanding re-entry phenomena.  These Redstones had two solid fuel upper stages added. The U.S. donated a spare Sparta for Australia's first satellite launch, WRESAT, in November 1967.

Operators
 United States Army
40th Field Artillery Group 1958–1961 – West Germany
1st Battalion, 333rd Artillery Regiment
46th Field Artillery Group 1959–1961 – West Germany
2nd Battalion, 333rd Artillery Regiment
209th Field Artillery Group – Fort Sill, Oklahoma
4th Bn, 333rd Artillery Regiment

Surviving examples
Displayed as PGM-11:
National Air and Space Museum at the Udvar-Hazy Center, Washington, DC
Warren, New Hampshire
US Space and Rocket Center, Huntsville, Alabama
Battleship Memorial Park, Mobile, Alabama
Air Force Space and Missile Museum, Cape Canaveral, Florida
Kansas Cosmosphere, Hutchinson, Kansas (payload and aft unit only)
National Museum of Nuclear Science and History, Albuquerque, New Mexico
White Sands Missile Range Museum, White Sands, New Mexico
Evergreen Aviation Museum, McMinnville, Oregon
Marshall Space Flight Center, Huntsville, Alabama
US Army Field Artillery Museum, Fort Sill, Oklahoma
Displayed as Jupiter-C
US Space and Rocket Center, Huntsville, Alabama
Kennedy Space Center Visitor Complex, Merritt Island, Florida
Marshall Space Flight Center, Huntsville, Alabama
Petal, Mississippi (formerly at John C. Stennis Space Center's StenniSphere, now INFINITY Science Center, not publicly visible)
Displayed as a Mercury-Redstone Launch Vehicle
Kennedy Space Center Visitor Complex, Merritt Island, Florida
One in the rocket garden, one near the badging office, and one at Launch Complex 5
Air Zoo, Kalamazoo, Michigan (in storage)
Kansas Cosmosphere, Hutchinson, Kansas
Museum of Life + Science, Durham, North Carolina
 Parque de las Ciencias Luis A. Ferré at Bayamón, Puerto Rico
Space Center Houston, Houston, Texas
Mercury-Redstone Launch Vehicles
US Space and Rocket Center, Huntsville, Alabama
United States Astronaut Hall of Fame, Kennedy Space Center Visitor Complex

Gallery

See also

Comparable missiles
 Ghaznavi
 Abdali-I
 Shaheen-I
 J-600T Yıldırım
 SOM
 Bora
 Fateh-313
 Qiam 1
 Al-Hussein
 Nasr
 Zelzal
 Tondar-69
 Burkan-1

References

Bibliography

  Technology and Culture, Vol. 4, No. 4, The History of Rocket Technology (Autumn 1963), pp. 452–465.

External links 

 Redstone Army Command site
 NASA Documents relating to Redstone and Mercury Projects
 Redstone Image Collection
 Redstone from Encyclopedia Astronautica
 Redstone timeline
 Boeing: History– Products – North American Aviation Rocketdyne Redstone Rocket Engine
 Appendix A: The Redstone Missile in Detail
 Redstone at the White Sands Missile Range
 40th Artillery Group (Redstone)
 46th Artillery Group (Redstone)
 From the Stars & Stripes Archives: "Redstone Rocketeers"
 Jupiter A
 The Chrysler Corporation Missile Division and the Redstone missiles
 Brigadier General Julius Braun Collection, The University of Alabama in Huntsville Archives and Special Collections Files of Julius Braun, Project Officer for the Redstone missiles.

1960 in spaceflight
1961 in spaceflight
Cold War missiles of the United States
Marshall Space Flight Center
Nuclear weapons of the United States
Short-range ballistic missiles
Project Mercury
PGM-011
Wernher von Braun
Operation Paperclip
Military equipment introduced in the 1950s